The 1872 United States presidential election in Florida took place on November 5, 1872, as part of the 1872 United States presidential election. Voters chose four representatives, or electors to the Electoral College, who voted for president and vice president.

Florida voted for the Republican candidate, Ulysses S. Grant, over Liberal Republican candidate, Horace Greeley. Grant won Florida by a margin of 7.04%.

Results

See also 

 1872 United States House of Representatives election in Florida
 1872 Florida gubernatorial election

References

Florida
1872
1872 Florida elections